Déborah Gyurcsek Olivera (born December 7, 1978) is a female track and field athlete from Uruguay, who competes in the pole vault event. A one-time Olympian (2000), she won the bronze medal at the 1999 Pan American Games in Winnipeg, Manitoba, Canada. Her personal best is 4.23 metres achieved in 2000.

Achievements

References
 

1978 births
Living people
Uruguayan pole vaulters
Athletes (track and field) at the 1999 Pan American Games
Athletes (track and field) at the 2000 Summer Olympics
Athletes (track and field) at the 2003 Pan American Games
Athletes (track and field) at the 2007 Pan American Games
Athletes (track and field) at the 2011 Pan American Games
Uruguayan people of Hungarian descent
Olympic athletes of Uruguay
Pan American Games bronze medalists for Uruguay
Female pole vaulters
Uruguayan female athletes
Pan American Games medalists in athletics (track and field)
Medalists at the 1999 Pan American Games